Ali Sadikhov (born 13 August 1999) is an Azerbaijani footballer who plays as a midfielder for Sabail in the Azerbaijan Premier League.

Club career
On 9 November 2019, Sadikhov made his debut in the Azerbaijan Premier League for Sabail match against Gabala.

References

External links
 

1999 births
Living people
Association football midfielders
Azerbaijani footballers
Azerbaijan Premier League players
Gabala FC players
Sabail FK players